Dactylonia monnioti is a small shrimp in the family Palaemonidae, first described by Alexander James Bruce. The species epithet honours Claude Monniot who was responsible for finding the species.

Dactylonia monnioti is only known from New Caledonia, and is a benthic species dwelling at depths of 260 - 285 metres.

References

Palaemonoidea
Crustaceans of the Pacific Ocean
Crustaceans described in 1990
Taxa named by Alexander James Bruce